Oleksandr Oleksandrovych Holovko (born 11 March 1995) is a Ukrainian professional football defender who plays for Raon-l'Étape.

Career
Holovko is a product of the different youth sportive schools in his native Kiev. He signed a three-year contract with FC Dynamo Kyiv in the Ukrainian Premier League in February 2013, but did not debut for the first-squad team. In October 2016, Holovko signed a contract with the Ukrainian First League FC Desna Chernihiv.

Personal life
Holovko is the eldest son of the retired Ukrainian international footballer and current manager Oleksandr Holovko. He has also a brother Andriy and sister Arina.

Honours

Desna Chernihiv
 Ukrainian First League: 2017–18

References

External links
 
 

1995 births
Living people
Piddubny Olympic College alumni
Footballers from Kyiv
Ukrainian footballers
Association football defenders
FC Arsenal Kyiv players
FC Dynamo Kyiv players
FC Dynamo-2 Kyiv players
FC Desna Chernihiv players
FC Hirnyk-Sport Horishni Plavni players
FC Kremin Kremenchuk players
FC Prykarpattia Ivano-Frankivsk (1998) players
US Raon-l'Étape players
Ukrainian First League players
Ukrainian expatriate footballers
Expatriate footballers in France
Ukrainian expatriate sportspeople in France